Scott Dixon (born 28 September 1976) is a Scottish former professional boxer. He held the Commonwealth welterweight title in 2000 and challenged for the British welterweight title in 1999.

References

External links

Image - Scott Dixon

1976 births
Featherweight boxers
Light-middleweight boxers
Lightweight boxers
Light-welterweight boxers
Middleweight boxers
Sportspeople from Hamilton, South Lanarkshire
Scottish male boxers
Super-featherweight boxers
Super-middleweight boxers
Welterweight boxers
Living people